This seat should not be confused with the current Croydon South constituency

Croydon South was a constituency represented in the House of Commons of the Parliament of the United Kingdom. It elected one Member of Parliament (MP) by the first past the post system.

It was created for the 1918 general election when the County Borough of Croydon had grown so the Croydon seat was split into two seats.

In 1974 the seat was redrawn and renamed Croydon Central; following the 1965 addition of Purley and Coulsdon to the London Borough of Croydon in 1974 a fresh seat of Croydon South was created to the south predominantly from East Surrey rather than from the historic Croydon South.

It did not exist from 1950 to 1955 as an east–west division of the town was chosen instead. Its voters elected twice Labour candidates, for the 1945 and 1966 Parliaments when the Labour Party received strong majorities, and at all other elections elected Conservative candidates.

Boundaries
1918-1950: The County Borough of Croydon wards of Central, East, South, and West.

1955-1965: The County Borough of Croydon wards of Addington, Broad Green, Central, Shirley, South, and Waddon.

1965-1974: The London Borough of Croydon wards of Addington, Broad Green, Central, Shirley, South, and Waddon.

Members of Parliament

MPs 1918–1950 

From 1950 to 1955 the seat was divided into Croydon East and Croydon West.

MPs 1955–1974

Election results

Elections in the 1910s

Elections in the 1920s

Elections in 1930s

Elections in 1940s

Elections in 1950s

Elections in 1960s

Elections in 1970s

Politics and history of the constituency
The seat was created in 1918 and the first MP was Ian Malcolm, who had been the MP for all of Croydon. H.T. Muggeridge, father of Malcolm Muggeridge, fought the seat for Labour four times from 1918, later becoming MP for Romford. The seat saw a by-election in 1932, won by Herbert Williams.

Croydon South had twice seen Croydon's only Labour MPs before the 1990s. David Rees-Williams held the seat from the 1945 Labour landslide until unfavourable boundary changes in 1950. David Winnick won the seat in 1966 before losing in 1970. Otherwise the seat, and indeed the rest of Croydon, had always been firm Conservative territory.

From 1950 until 1955 the seat was divided into east and west, represented by Conservatives Herbert Williams and Richard Thompson respectively.

References

Sources 

Politics of the London Borough of Croydon
Parliamentary constituencies in London (historic)
Constituencies of the Parliament of the United Kingdom established in 1918
Constituencies of the Parliament of the United Kingdom disestablished in 1950
Constituencies of the Parliament of the United Kingdom established in 1955
Constituencies of the Parliament of the United Kingdom disestablished in 1974